English Canada comprises that part of the population within Canada, whether of British origin or otherwise, that speaks English.      

The term English Canada can also be used for one of the following:
Describing all the provinces of Canada that have an anglophone majority. This is every province except Quebec. When used in this way, English Canada is often referred to as the "ROC" (Rest of Canada). This type of usage excludes French-speaking areas in English-majority provinces like the East and North of New Brunswick, Northern and Eastern Ontario, Saint-Boniface and the few small pockets of French localities in Western Canada. It also excludes areas where a third language is widely spoken, such as German, Russian or First Nations languages.
When discussing the culture, values and lifestyles of English-speaking Canadians as opposed to those of French-speaking Canadians. This usage is most often employed to compare English- and French-language literature, media, art and institutions.
When discussing the Two Solitudes, in which English Canada (i.e. the anglophones of Canada) is one of two founding nations of Canada along with French Canada (i.e. the francophones of Canada), and in which these two societies share a country but rarely communicate with each other. The term was often used during the conscription crisis. The population whose native language is neither English nor French are often included into one of the two official languages or are classified as allophones.
English Canadians, in some contexts, refers to Canadians who have origins in England, in contrast to Canadiens (i.e., French Canadians or ), Scottish Canadians, Irish Canadians, etc.

See also

Demolinguistic descriptors used in Canada
French Canadians
Official bilingualism in Canada
English Canadians

References

Canadian culture
Culture of Quebec
Canada

Linguistic geography of Canada